John T. Gourville is an American economist currently the Albert J. Weatherhead, Jr. Professor of Business Administration at Harvard Business School.

References

Year of birth missing (living people)
Living people
Harvard Business School faculty
University of Chicago alumni
American economists